James Hamilton Ross (May 12, 1856 – December 14, 1932) was a Canadian politician, the third commissioner of Yukon, and an ardent defender of territorial rights. He is also considered to be the first resident of Moose Jaw, Saskatchewan.

Early life
Ross was born in 1856 to John Edgar Ross and Christina Graeme (Hathern) Ross. On January 2, 1882, Ross, a western Canadian rancher born in London, Canada West, and four other men were scouting the location for the Canadian Pacific Railway divisional point when they became the first residents of the modern-day town of Moose Jaw, Saskatchewan.

Four days later, Ross established a homestead on the site, becoming the town's first permanent resident.

Territorial political career
Soon after, Ross became an active participant in territorial government. He continuously campaigned for responsible government and was active in the negotiations to create the provinces of Alberta and Saskatchewan.

Ross sat in the Legislative Assembly of the Northwest Territories between 1883 and 1901, and was Speaker from 1891 to 1894 and a member of the Executive Council between 1895 and 1897. Ross also served as treasurer and then became the Commissioner of the Yukon Territory on March 11, 1901, becoming the first Yukon Commissioner to reside in Government House in Dawson City.

Personal life and family
On August 15, 1901, his wife and youngest son, William, were lost in the sinking of the SS Islander near Juneau.

Another of his daughters, Jane Ross, married Alistair Fraser, the son of Lieutenant-Governor of Nova Scotia Duncan Cameron Fraser, who later went on to become Lieutenant-Governor in his own right.

His son, James Hamilton Ross, a chemist at McGill University, developed and patented a new method of synthesizing RDX used by the Allies in the Second World War. He was awarded the Medal of Freedom as well as Member of the Order of the British Empire.

Federal political career
Ross ran for a seat to the House of Commons of Canada in a by-election held on December 2, 1902. He became the Yukon's first Member of Parliament defeating Yukon territorial councilor Joseph Clarke. He did not visit the Yukon Territory during the campaign and incurred no election expenses other than his deposit.

Ross was appointed to the Senate in 1904. Between 1904 and 1905, Ross represented Regina, Northwest Territories and after 1905 until his death, he continued to represent Regina after the creation of the province of Saskatchewan. From 1902 until his death, Ross was a member of the Liberal Party caucus.

James Hamilton Ross died in 1932 in Victoria, British Columbia.

References

External links
James Hamilton Ross Encyclopedia of Canada
James Hamilton Ross – Canadian Confederation at www.collectionscanada.ca

Speakers of the Legislative Assembly of the Northwest Territories
Members of the House of Commons of Canada from Yukon
Liberal Party of Canada MPs
Canadian senators from the Northwest Territories
Canadian senators from Saskatchewan
Canadian people of Scottish descent
Members of the Legislative Assembly of the Northwest Territories
1856 births
1932 deaths
Politicians from London, Ontario
Persons of National Historic Significance (Canada)